Jan Żurek (born 14 July 1956) is a Polish football manager.

References

1956 births
Living people
Polish football managers
Górnik Zabrze managers
Widzew Łódź managers
Ruch Chorzów managers
GKS Katowice managers
Podbeskidzie Bielsko-Biała managers
Polonia Warsaw managers
Śląsk Wrocław managers
Jagiellonia Białystok managers
GKS Tychy managers
Polish footballers
People from Oleśnica
Association footballers not categorized by position